Graphite is a free open-source software (FOSS) tool that monitors and graphs numeric time-series data such as the performance of computer systems.
Graphite was developed by Orbitz Worldwide, Inc and released as open-source software in 2008.

Graphite collects, stores, and displays time-series data in real time.

The tool has three main components:
 Carbon - a Twisted daemon that listens for time-series data
 Whisper - a simple database library for storing time-series data (similar in design to RRD)
 Graphite webapp - A Django webapp that renders graphs on-demand using Cairo library.

Graphite is used in production by companies such as Ford Motor Company, Booking.com, GitHub, Etsy, The Washington Post and Electronic Arts.

References

External links 
 Development page
 Latest documentation
 Screenshots, FAQ and outdated documentation
 Tools That Work With Graphite, mentioning and describing e.g. Grafana, a Graphite dashboard replacement

See also 
 Grafana

Free software